Liga ASOBAL 2000–01 season was the 11th since its establishment. A total of 14 teams competed this season for the championship.

Competition format
This season, the competition was played in a round-robin format, through 26 rounds. The team with most points earned wins the championship.

Overall standing

Top goal scorers
Top scorers are:

References

2000
Spain
Liga Ascobal